James Preston (1792 – 9 April 1842) was an English cricketer.  Preston's batting style is unknown.

Preston made a single first-class appearance for Sussex against Kent at the Royal New Ground, Brighton, in 1828.  He ended Sussex's first-innings of 118 all out unbeaten on 29, while in response to that total Kent were dismissed for just 23.  In Sussex's second-innings of 102 all out, Preston scored 17 runs before being dismissed by William Ashby.  Kent made 96/8 in their chase, with the match ending in a draw.

He died at Kingston in the British Colony of Jamaica on 19 April 1842.

References

External links
James Preston at ESPNcricinfo
James Preston at CricketArchive

1792 births
1842 deaths
English cricketers
Sussex cricketers
Cricketers from Kingston, Jamaica